The Fiat X1/23 is a concept car originally shown in 1972 at the Turin Motor Show and in 1976 as an electric car by the Italian manufacturer Fiat. Designed by Centro Stile Fiat, it is a small two-seater  city car, unlike any Fiat produced at the time.

The 1976 X1/23 is fitted with a 14 kW electric motor driving the front wheels and equipped with regenerative braking. Batteries are located at the rear. Despite its diminutive size, the car weighs ,  of which was due to the battery.

References

Electric concept cars
X1 23
X1 23